The 1954 Pro Bowl was the National Football League's (NFL) fourth annual all-star game which featured the league's outstanding performers from the 1953 season. The game was played on January 17, 1954, at the Los Angeles Memorial Coliseum in Los Angeles, California in front of 44,214 fans. The East squad defeated the West by a score of 20–9.

The West team was led by the Detroit Lions' Buddy Parker while Paul Brown of the Cleveland Browns coached the East squad. Philadelphia Eagles linebacker Chuck Bednarik was named the game's outstanding player.

References

External links

Pro Bowl
Pro Bowl
Pro Bowl
Pro Bowl
1954 in Los Angeles
National Football League in Los Angeles
January 1954 sports events in the United States